Vicarello is a town in Tuscany, central Italy, administratively a frazione of the comune of Collesalvetti, province of Livorno.

The town is about 16 km from Livorno and 3 km from Collesalvetti.

Bibliography 
 

Frazioni of the Province of Livorno
Collesalvetti